Manuela Oschmann (née Drescher, born 9 June 1965) is a former German cross-country skier who competed during the 1980s. She won a bronze medal in the 4 ×  5 km relay at the 1985 FIS Nordic World Ski Championships in Seefeld, Austria. She also competed in three events at the 1992 Winter Olympics.

Cross-country skiing results
All results are sourced from the International Ski Federation (FIS).

Olympic Games

World Championships
 1 medal – (1 bronze)

World Cup

Season standings

Team podiums

 1 podium

Note:   Until the 1999 World Championships, World Championship races were included in the World Cup scoring system.

References

External links
World Championship results 

1965 births
Living people
German female cross-country skiers
FIS Nordic World Ski Championships medalists in cross-country skiing
Olympic cross-country skiers of Germany
Cross-country skiers at the 1992 Winter Olympics
People from Zella-Mehlis
Sportspeople from Thuringia